Craig Ellwood (April 22, 1922 – May 30, 1992) was an influential Los Angeles-based modernist architect whose career spanned the early 1950s through the mid-1970s. Although untrained as an architect, Ellwood fashioned a persona and career through equal parts of a talent for good design, self-promotion and ambition. He was recognized professionally for fusing of the formalism of Mies van der Rohe with the informal style of California modernism.

Early years
Ellwood was born Jon Nelson Burke in Clarendon, Texas. Along with many others in the 1920s, Ellwood's family moved west, following U.S. Route 66, finally settling in Los Angeles in 1937. There, Ellwood, as Johnnie Burke, attended Belmont High School, where he was class president before graduating in 1940. In 1942, Ellwood and his brother Cleve both joined the U.S. Army Air Corps. Ellwood served as a B-24 radio operator, based with Cleve in Victorville, California, until his discharge in 1946.

Career
After his discharge from the Army, Burke returned to Los Angeles and set up a company with his brother Cleve and two friends from the war, the Marzicola brothers, one of whom had a contractor's license. The four men called their firm 'Craig Ellwood' after a liquor store called Lords and Elwood located in front of their offices. Burke later legally changed his name to Ellwood.

In 1948, he joined the firm Lamport Cofer Salzman (L.C.S.) as a construction cost estimator, having acquired this skill during his work for the Craig Ellwood Company. Ellwood also studied structural engineering through UCLA extension night school for five years. He became increasingly involved in design and architecture, resulting in Ellwood's first commissions, all for residences.

Ellwood established 'Craig Ellwood Design' in 1951. There, Ellwood would provide the commissions and the vision, and it was up to USC-trained architect Robert Theron 'Pete' Peters, and later others, to provide the technical realization, drawings and the required sign-off of a licensed architect. Early projects included Case Study House 16 in 1952. The designs were well received by both the trade and potential clients, often receiving favorable coverage in influential publications like John Entenza's Arts & Architecture, often arranged for by Ellwood personally. Thus the firm received a growing stream of both residential and commercial commissions, and Ellwood's style matured to fully embrace the concepts put forth by International Style architects, particularly Mies van der Rohe.

By the late-1950s, though not a licensed architect, Ellwood was nonetheless a sought-after university lecturer, eventually giving a series of talks at Yale University, and teaching at the University of Southern California and California State Polytechnic University, Pomona's Department of Architecture.

Though Ellwood's office expanded with the size and number of his commissions, it was never a particularly profitable enterprise. It continued through the mid-1970s, with several notable projects, including the master plan for the Rand Corporation's headquarters in Santa Monica, California, a number of Xerox and IBM offices, and the trademark "bridge building" dramatically spanning an arroyo and a roadway at Art Center College of Design in Pasadena.

As published in the 1976, the Art Center building is recognized as the work of Craig Ellwood Associates, with James Tyler as design architect and Stephen Woolley as project architect. Some sources have sought to re-credit this building solely to Tyler, who had worked for John Sugden (a former associate of Mies) and was the architect of the Art Center addition, completed in 1991. The practice closed in 1977 and Ellwood retired to Italy to focus on painting and on restoring a farm house near .

Personal life
Elwood's first wife was Faith Irene Walker, known as "Bobbie". In 1949 he married actress Gloria Henry. They had three children, including designer Erin Ellwood, and divorced in 1977. He then married Anita Eubank and moved to Pergine Valdarno, Italy. After his divorce from Eubank, he and his fourth wife, Leslie Hyland Ellwood, had a daughter.

Death
Ellwood died on May 30, 1992, in Pergine Valdarno; he was 70 years old.

Significant projects
 Lappin House, Cheviot Hills, Los Angeles, California, 1948 
 Hale House, Beverly Hills, California, 1949 
 The New Case Study House 16 (Salzman House), Bel Air, California, 1951–53
 Courtyard Apartments, Hollywood, California, 1952–53 
 Case Study House 17B (Hoffman House), Beverly Hills, California, 1954–56
 Case Study House 18 (Fields House), Beverly Hills, California, 1955–58
 Smith House, Los Angeles, California, 1955 
 Hunt House, Malibu, California, 1955 
 South Bay Bank, Los Angeles, California, 1956  
 Carson-Roberts Office Building, West Hollywood, California, 1958–60 
 Daphne House, Hillsborough, California, 1960–61 
 Scientific Data Systems, various buildings and offices, El Segundo and Pomona, California, 1966–69 
 Max Palevsky House, Palm Springs, California, 1968 
 Charles and Gerry Bobertz Residence, San Diego, California, 1953 
Art Center College of Design (Hillside Campus), Pasadena, California, 1976 
Kubly House, Pasadena, CA, 1965. Built for President of Art Center College of Design, Don and Sally Kubly.

Bibliography
 Craig Ellwood Paintings, published by Converso Gallery, 2004, essay by Jeffrey Head
 "What Does Post-Modernism Mean to You?" L.A. Architect, March 1976.

References

1922 births
1992 deaths
Modernist architects from the United States
Belmont High School (Los Angeles) alumni
California State Polytechnic University, Pomona faculty
Architects from Los Angeles
20th-century American architects
People from Clarendon, Texas
Military personnel from California
United States Army Air Forces personnel of World War II